A gamecock is a rooster that is bred for fighting. Gamecock may also refer to:

South Carolina history and symbolism
 Thomas Sumter, the "Carolina Gamecock" (1734–1832), South Carolina military leader during the American Revolution
 The South Carolina Gamecocks, the varsity sports teams of the University of South Carolina
 The Daily Gamecock, a student newspaper of the University of South Carolina
 Sumter Gamecocks, the varsity sports teams of Sumter High School in Sumter, SC

Military
 Gloster Gamecock, a biplane fighter of the Royal Air Force
 Gamecock Barracks (formerly HMS Gamecock), a military installation in England

Other
 Gamecock Cottage, an historic building located at Stony Brook in Suffolk County, New York
 The Gamecock (film), a 1974 Italian comedy film
 Gamecock Media Group, a video game publisher based in Austin, Texas
 Saltbush Bill's Gamecock, a humorous poem by Australian writer and poet Andrew Barton "Banjo" Paterson

See also
 Cock (disambiguation)